The Poetry Now Award is an annual literary prize presented for the best single volume of poetry by an Irish poet. The €5,000 award was first given in 2005 (reduced to €2,500 in 2013) and is presented during annual Dún Laoghaire–Rathdown poetry festivals. From 2005 to 2011, it was bestowed during the Poetry Now international poetry festival (the latter event was inaugurated in 1996) which was held in March or April each year. In 2012 and 2013, the award was given during the Mountains to Sea dlr Book Festival, in September ("dlr" stands for "Dún Laoghaire–Rathdown"). The award is sponsored by The Irish Times newspaper.

History

2018
Winner: Leontia Flynn, for The Radio

Shortlist:
 Tara Bergin, The Tragic Death of Eleanor Marx
 Leontia Flynn, The Radio
 Conor O'Callaghan, Live Streaming
 Mark Roper, Bindweed
 David Wheatley, The President of Planet Earth

Judges:

 Fran Brearton, John McAuliffe and Gerard Smyth

2017
Winner: Paddy Bushe, for On A Turning Wing

2016
Winner: Caitríona O’Reilly, for Geis

2015
Winner: Theo Dorgan, for Nine Bright Shiners

2014
Winner: Sinéad Morrissey, for Parallax

2013
Winner: Dennis O'Driscoll, for Dear Life, awarded posthumously (he died in December 2012).

Shortlist:
 Catherine Phil MacCarthy, The Invisible Threshold.
 Dennis O'Driscoll, Dear Life.
 Harry Clifton, The Winter Sleep of Captain Lemass.
 James Harpur, Angels and Harvesters.
 Mark Roper, A Gather of Shadow.

Judges: Mary O'Donnell (poet and novelist), Peter Sirr (writer, editor, translator, and former winner), and Ruth Webster (bookseller).

2012
Winner: Michael Longley, for A Hundred Doors.

Shortlist:
 Moya Cannon, Hands.
 Michael Longley, A Hundred Doors.
 John Montague, Speech Lessons.
 Bernard O'Donoghue, Farmers Cross.
 Macdara Woods, The Cotard Dimension.

Judges:  Gerald Dawe, James Harpur, and Mary Shine Thompson (all poets).

2011
Winner: Seamus Heaney, for Human Chain.

Shortlist:
 Sara Berkeley, The View from Here.
 Ciarán Carson, Until Before After.
 Dermot Healy, A Fool's Errand.
 Seamus Heaney, Human Chain.
 Paul Muldoon, Maggot.

Judges:  Brian Lynch (poet, novelist, and screenwriter), Leanne O'Sullivan (poet), and Borbála Faragó (lecturer and critic).

2010

Winner: Sinéad Morrissey, for Through the Square Window.

Shortlist: 
 Ciarán Carson, On the Night Watch.
 Vona Groarke, Spindrift.
 Sinéad Morrissey, Through the Square Window.
 Eiléan Ní Chuilleanáin, The Sun-fish.
 Peter Sirr, The Thing Is.

Judges:  John F. Deane, Alan Gillis, and Maria Johnston.

2009

Winner: Derek Mahon, for Life on Earth.

Shortlist:
 Colette Bryce, Self-Portrait in the Dark.
 Ciarán Carson, For All We Know.
 Leontia Flynn, Drives.
 Pearse Hutchinson, At Least For a While.
 Derek Mahon, Life on Earth.

Judges:  Kit Fryatt, Sean O'Brien, and Joseph Woods.

2008

Winner: Harry Clifton, for Secular Eden: Paris Notebooks 1994–2004.

Shortlist:
 Harry Clifton, Secular Eden: Paris Notebooks 1994–2004.
 Eamon Grennan, Out of Breath.
 Dave Lordan, The Boy in the Ring.
 Dennis O'Driscoll, Reality Check.
 Matthew Sweeney, Black Moon.

Judges:  Philip Coleman, Sasha Dugdale, and William Wall.

2007

Winner: Seamus Heaney, for District and Circle.

Shortlist:
 Seamus Heaney, District and Circle.
 Medbh McGuckian, The Currach Requires No Harbours.
 Paul Muldoon, Horse Latitudes.
 Caitriona O'Reilly, The Sea Cabinet.
 David Wheatley, Mocker.

Judges:  Eileen Battersby, Niall MacMonagle, and Maurice Riordan.

2006

Winner: Derek Mahon, for Harbour Lights.

Shortlist:
 John F. Deane, The Instruments of Art.
 Nick Laird, To a Fault.
 Derek Mahon, Harbour Lights.
 Sinéad Morrissey, The State of the Prisons.
 Conor O'Callaghan, Fiction.

Judges:  Patrick Crotty, Gerard Fanning, and Fiona Sampson.

2005

Winner: Dorothy Molloy, for Hare Soup, awarded posthumously (she died in January 2004) for her début collection.

Shortlist:
 Paul Durcan, The Art of Life.
 Alan Gillis, Somebody Somewhere.
 Medbh McGuckian, The Book of the Angel.
 Dorothy Molloy, Hare Soup.
 Peter Sirr, Nonetheless.
Judges:  Simon Armitage, Selina Guinness, and Colm Tóibín.

References

External links
 Poetry Now, website for the annual international poetry festival.
 Mountains to Sea dlr Book Festival, website for the annual book festival.

2005 establishments in Ireland
Awards established in 2005
Irish literary awards
Literary awards by magazines and newspapers
Poetry awards
The Irish Times
Poetry festivals in Ireland